Parapsestis tomponis is a moth in the family Drepanidae. It was described by Shōnen Matsumura in 1933. It is found in Taiwan, Vietnam and the Chinese provinces of Henan, Shaanxi, Gansu, Hubei, Hunan, Fujian, Sichuan, Guizhou and Yunnan.

Subspecies
Parapsestis tomponis tomponis (Taiwan)
Parapsestis tomponis almasderes Laszlo, G. Ronkay, L. Ronkay & Witt, 2007 (Vietnam, China: Henan, Shaanxi, Gansu, Hubei, Hunan, Fujian, Sichuan, Guizhou, Yunnan)

References

Moths described in 1933
Thyatirinae
Moths of Asia